Gaviyeh (also Romanized as Gāvīyeh) is a village in Shirju Posht Rural District, Rudboneh District, Lahijan County, Gilan Province, Iran. At the 2006 census, its population was 775, in 235 families.

References 

Populated places in Lahijan County